Iza Zorec (born 22 March 2000) is a Slovenian rhythmic gymnast. On national level, she is the 2018 National All-around silver medalist and a three-time (2016, 2017, 2019) National All-around bronze medalist.

Career

Junior
Zorec and her teammates Aleksandra Podgoršek, Aja Jerman and Taja Karner competed at the 2014 Junior European Championships in Baku, Azerbaijan where they finished on 23rd place in Team competition.

Senior
She represented her country at the 2019 World Championships in Baku, Azerbaijan, where she placed 22nd in Team competition together with Ekaterina Vedeneeva, Aleksandra Podgoršek and Aja Jerman. She placed 115th in Clubs and 86th in Ribbon Qualifications. She also competed at the 2017 European Championships and placed 21st in Team competition together with Anja Tomazin, Aja Jerman and Junior group.

Routine music information

References

External links
 Profile on International Gymnastics Federation (FIG) website

Living people
2000 births
Sportspeople from Ljubljana
Slovenian rhythmic gymnasts